Landshut is a town in Bavaria in the south-east of Germany. Situated on the banks of the River Isar, Landshut is the capital of Lower Bavaria, one of the seven administrative regions of the Free State of Bavaria. It is also the seat of the surrounding district, and has a population of more than 70,000. Landshut is the largest city in Lower Bavaria, followed by Passau and Straubing, and Eastern Bavaria's second biggest city.

Owing to its characteristic coat of arms, the town is also often called "City of the three Helmets". Furthermore, the town is popularly known for the Landshuter Hochzeit (Landshut Wedding), a full-tilt medieval festival.

Due to its proximity and easy access to Munich and the Franz Josef Strauss International Airport, Landshut became a powerful and future-oriented investment area. The town is one of the richest industrialized towns in Bavaria and has East Bavaria's lowest unemployment rate.

Geography

Settings
Landshut lies in the centre of Lower Bavaria and is part of the Alpine foothills. The River Isar runs through the city centre.

History
The city of Landshut and Trausnitz castle were founded in 1204 by Duke Louis I. Landshut was already a Wittelsbach residence by 1231, and in 1255, when the duchy of Bavaria was split in two, Landshut also became the capital of Lower Bavaria. Duke Henry XVI was the first of the three famous rich dukes who ruled Bayern-Landshut in the 15th century. The wedding of Duke George with the Polish Princess Royal Jadwiga Jagiellon in 1475 was celebrated in Landshut with one of the most splendid festivals of the Middle Ages (called "Landshuter Hochzeit"). After his death and the Landshut War of Succession, Bavaria-Landshut was reunited with Bavaria-Munich.

Louis X, Duke of Bavaria built the Landshut Residence 1537–1543 after his visit to Italy. Louis built the first Renaissance palace constructed north of the Alps after the Palazzo Te in Mantua. William V, Duke of Bavaria ordered to upgrade Trausnitz Castle from a gothic fortification into a renaissance complex when he lived in Landshut as crown prince for ten years until 1579. Afterwards Landshut lost most of its importance until the University of Ingolstadt was moved to Landshut in 1800.  However, in 1826 the university was transferred to Munich.

During the Thirty Years' War, the city was taken and plundered by Swedish forces three times, (1632, 1634 and 1648).

Napoleon fought and won the Battle of Landshut in 1809 against an Austrian army as part of the War of the Fifth Coalition.

During World War II, a subcamp of Dachau concentration camp was located in the city to provide slave labour for local industry. The city was taken by US troops on April 29, 1945.

The U.S. Army maintained facilities in Landshut, including Pinder Kaserne and a dependent housing area, until 1968.

Since the opening of Munich Airport close to Landshut in 1992, the town has become an attractive business location.

Main sights and culture

The town is of national importance because of its predominantly Gothic architecture within the historic town centre, especially Trausnitz Castle and the Church of Saint Martin featuring the world's tallest brick tower. Among other Gothic architecture are the churches of St. Jodok and Holy Spirit, but also the Town Hall and the Ländtor, the only still existing gate of the medieval fortification.

Landshut is also known for a festival celebrated every four years called the Landshuter Hochzeit, commemorating the 1475 marriage of George of Bavaria and Jadwiga Jagiellon.

The renaissance era produced in particular the decorated inner courtyard of the Trausnitz Castle and the ducal Landshut Residence in the inner town. Baroque churches are represented by the Jesuit church St. Ignatius, the Dominican church St. Blasius and the church of St. Joseph. Also the medieval churches of the Seligenthal convent and of the Cistercians were redesigned in baroque style. Many old middle-class houses of the past in the Old Town still represent the history of the town from the Gothic times to the Neo-Classicism.

Transportation
There are regular regional train connections to Munich, Passau, Salzburg, Rosenheim, Nuremberg and Hof.

Sport
The most successful professional team in the city is ice hockey team EV Landshut, playing currently in the Second Division.

The other professional team is the city is motorcycle speedway team Landshut Devils, who are based at the Ellermühle Speedway Stadium.

The local association football team is SpVgg Landshut with both men's and women's team previously having reached the top state division.

Culture

Theatres
 Stadttheater (city theatre)
 Kleines Theater
 Theater Nikola

Cinemas
 Kinoptikum – repertory cinema 
 Kinopolis Landshut – Multiplex cinema 
 Burgtheater/Kühlhauskino

Museums
 Skulpturenmuseum im Hofberg (Sculptural Museum in Hofberg)
 LANDSHUTmuseum in the cloister of the old Franciscan monastery

Venues
 Eisstadion am Gutenbergweg – Indoor Ice hockey arena, mainly used by the Landshut Cannibals
 Sparkassen-Arena – Mainly used for concerts and fairs
 Grieserwiese – Giant parking area located between Wittstraße and the bank of the river Isar used for the annual Frühjahrs- und Bartlmädult

Businesses
BMW
Dräxlmaier Group
Deutsche Telekom
ebmpapst
LFoundry, a semiconductor fab formerly owned by Renesas and before by Hitachi)
Schott Glass
Vishay
Karstadt
:de:Pöschl Tabak
There are also two nuclear power plants located 14 km away from Landshut, Isar I (Inactive) and Isar II (active until 2022).

Twin towns – sister cities

Landshut is twinned with:
 Elgin, Scotland, United Kingdom (1956), the Landshut Bridge in Elgin is named after Landshut
 Compiègne, France (1962)
 Ried im Innkreis, Austria (1974)
 Schio, Italy (1981)
 Sibiu, Romania (2002)

Notable people

Before 1920
Ulrich Füetrer (born before 1450; died around 1493 and 1502), poet and painter
Ludwig Feuerbach (1804–1872), philosopher
Friedrich Feuerbach (1806–1880), philologian and philosopher
Gustav Tiedemann (1808–1849), officer
Carl du Prel (1839–1899), philosopher, writer and occultist
Karl Tanera (1849–1904), officer of the Bavarian Army and author
Max Slevogt (1868–1932), painter, graphician
Otto Kissenberth (1893–1919), fighter pilot in World War I
Hermann Erhardt (1903–1958), actor
Max Schäfer (1907–1990), football player and manager
Marlene Neubauer-Woerner (1918–2010), sculptor

1920–present
Josef Deimer (born 1936), politician and Lord mayor of Landshut from 1970–2014
Roman Herzog (1934–2017), politician (CDU), President of Germany from 1994 to 1999, then Honorary Citizen as well
Klaus Auhuber (born 1951), ice hockey player
Gerhard Tausche (born 1958), archivist and author
Gerd Truntschka (born 1958), ice hockey player
Martin Bayerstorfer (born 1966), politician 
Alex Holzwarth (born 1968), drummer
Wolfgang Stark (born 1969), football referee
Markus Brunnermeier (born 1969), financial economist
Annette Dytrt (born 1983), figure skater

Honorary citizens
Hans Leinberger (1475/1480 – after 1531), sculptor
Ludwig Andreas Feuerbach, (1804–1872), philosopher and anthropologist
Roman Herzog (1934-2017), President of Germany 1994–1999
Josef Deimer (born 1936), Lord Mayor of Landshut 1970–2004
Erich Kühnhackl (born 1950), ice hockey player

Notable inhabitants

Louis I, Duke of Bavaria (1173–1231), Duke of Bavaria and Count Palatine of the Rhine
Hans von Burghausen (born 1350–1360; died 1432), builder
Hans Stethaimer (1360–1432), architect, mason and painter
Hans Leinberger (1480–1531), sculptor of the late Gothic
Götz von Berlichingen (1480–1562), Frankish Empire Knights
Renata of Lorraine (1544–1602), Duchess of Bavaria
Johann Graf von Aldringen (1588–1634), commander
Franz von Paula Schrank (1747–1835), botanist
Johann Michael Sailer (1751–1832), Catholic theologian and bishop of Regensburg
Franz Xaver Witt (1834–1888), church musician, composer, reformer, founder of the German general Cecilia Association
Max Freiherr von Oppenheim (1860–1946), diplomat, orientalist and archaeologist
Ludwig Thoma (1867–1921), writer
Hans Carossa (1878–1956), doctor, known as a poet and writer of short stories
Gregor Strasser (1892–1934), National Socialist politician
Heinrich Himmler (1900–1945), National Socialist politician, head of the SS
Marlene Neubauer-Woerner (1918–2010), sculptress
Fritz Koenig (1924–2017), sculptor
Heinz Winbeck (1946–2019), composer
Erich Kühnhackl (born 1950), ice hockey player
Tom Kühnhackl (born 1992), ice hockey player
David Elsner (born 1992), ice hockey player
Herbert Hainer (born 1954), manager
Steffen Kummerer (born 1985), musician, guitarist of Obscura

Gallery

See also
 Battle of Abensberg, occurred 20 April 1809
 Battle of Landshut, occurred 21 April 1809
 Battle of Eckmühl, occurred 21–22 April 1809
 Abensberg
 Eckmühl

References

External links

 
 http://www.landshut.de – Official website
  http://www.fh-landshut.de/

 
1204 establishments in Europe
[[Category:1200s establishments in Germany